The Entomologisk Tidskrift (English: Entomological Journal) is a peer-reviewed scientific journal published by the Entomological Society of Sweden (Swedish: Sveriges Entomologiska Förening) covering research on entomology, with an emphasis on Sweden and the other Nordic countries. It was established 1880 and is currently published triannually. The editor-in-chief is Emma Wahlberg (Swedish Museum of Natural History). The Entomologisk Tidskrift is abstracted and indexed in The  Zoological Record and Entomology Abstracts.

External links
 
 Entomological Society of Sweden

Entomology journals and magazines
Triannual journals
Publications established in 1880
Multilingual journals
Academic journals published by learned and professional societies
1880 establishments in Sweden